Dillwynia stipulifera is a species of flowering plant in the family Fabaceae and is endemic to New South Wales. It is an erect to spreading shrub with hairy stems, linear leaves and yellow flowers with red markings.

Description
The flowers are arranged in pairs in leaf axils near the ends of branchlets, forming a spherical cluster.

Taxonomy and naming
Dillwynia stipulifera was first formally described in 1939 by William Blakely in the journal The Australian Naturalist from specimens collected "between Clarence and Wolgan" by Joseph Maiden in 1906.

Distribution and habitat
This dillwynia grows in swampy heath over sandstone near Lithgow and in the Budawang Range. It is one of the species present in the endangered Newnes Plateau Shrub Swamp ecological community.

References

stipulifera
Flora of New South Wales
Plants described in 1939
Taxa named by William Blakely